Diamond Louis Stone (born February 10, 1997) is an American professional basketball player. He played one season of college basketball for Maryland before being drafted 40th overall in the 2016 NBA draft by the New Orleans Pelicans.

High school career
Stone attended Dominican High School in Whitefish Bay, Wisconsin. As a senior, he averaged 24.4 points and 11.7 rebounds per game. He finished his career with 2,193 points. During his four years, he helped lead Dominican to four-straight WIAA Division 4 state championships.

During the 2015 McDonald's All-American Game, Stone hit 7-of-9 shots for 14 points and also had three rebounds.

A five-star recruit coming out of high school, Stone committed to Maryland in March 2015, and signed with the program in April.

College career
Diamond Stone signed with Maryland.  Stone averaged 12.5 points, 5.4 rebounds and 1.6 blocks in his lone season at Maryland. Named AP Big Ten Newcomer of the Year, he established the Maryland freshman record and all-time XFinity Center mark with 39 points against Penn State on December 30, 2015.

On April 11, 2016, Stone declared for the NBA draft, forgoing his final three years of college eligibility.

College statistics

|-
| style="text-align:left;"| 2015–16
| style="text-align:left;"| Maryland
| 35 || 22 || 22.6 || .568 || .000 || .761 || 5.4 || .4 || .5 || 1.6 || 12.5
|-

Professional career

Los Angeles Clippers (2016–2017)
On June 23, 2016, Stone was selected by the New Orleans Pelicans with the 40th overall pick in the 2016 NBA draft. He was later traded to the Los Angeles Clippers on draft night. On July 14, 2016, he signed with the Clippers. Stone played only 24 minutes for the Clippers in his rookie season, but showed promise on both ends of the floor during his time in the NBA Development League; he had multiple assignments with the Santa Cruz Warriors and Salt Lake City Stars, pursuant to the flexible assignment rule.

Windy City Bulls and Salt Lake City Stars (2017–2018) 
On July 6, 2017, Stone was acquired by the Atlanta Hawks in a three-team trade involving the Clippers and the Denver Nuggets. On July 31, 2017, he was waived by the Hawks. On September 14, 2017, he signed with the Chicago Bulls. He was waived by the Bulls on October 16, 2017.

Stone started the season playing for the Windy City Bulls, and was traded to the Salt Lake City Stars for Henry Sims's rights and a third-round 2018 pick.

Iowa Wolves (2018–2019) 
Stone played in the summer leagues for the Utah Jazz.

On November 14, 2018, the Iowa Wolves acquired the returning right to Stone from the Salt Lake City Stars in exchange for the returning player right to Wes Washpun and a third-round draft pick in the 2019 NBA G League Draft. Later on November 26, 2018, the Iowa Wolves announced that they had acquired Stone, but was later waived by the Iowa Wolves on January 4, 2019.

Rio Grande Valley Vipers (2019)
On January 9, 2019, the Rio Grande Valley Vipers acquired Stone.

Puerto Rico (2021)
On February 3, 2021, Stone signed with the Guelph Nighthawks of the Canadian Elite Basketball League, but didn't play for them.

On July 1, 2021, Stone signed with the Mets de Guaynabo of the Baloncesto Superior Nacional. He averaged 20.4 points and 9.8 rebounds per game. On August 25, Stone signed with the Gigantes de Carolina.

TaiwanBeer HeroBears (2021–2022)
On November 9, 2021, Stone signed with the TaiwanBeer HeroBears of the T1 League. He was the league's scoring champion for the 2021–22 season.

San Miguel Beermen (2022)
In October 2022, he signed with the San Miguel Beermen of the Philippine Basketball Association (PBA) as the team's import for the 2022–23 PBA Commissioner's Cup.

Taichung Suns (2022)

On October 25, 2022, Stone signed with the Taichung Suns of the T1 League.

NBA career statistics

Regular season

|-
| style="text-align:left;"| 
| style="text-align:left;"| L.A. Clippers
| 7 || 0 || 3.5 || .231 || .000 || 1.000 || .9 || .0 || .0 || .1 || 1.4
|- class="sortbottom"
| style="text-align:center;" colspan="2"| Career
| 7 || 0 || 3.5 || .231 || .000 || 1.000 || .9 || .0 || .0 || .1 || 1.4

National team career
Stone was named to the All-Tournament Team of the 2014 FIBA Under-17 World Championship.

References

External links

Maryland Terrapins bio

1997 births
Living people
21st-century African-American sportspeople
African-American basketball players
American expatriate basketball people in the Philippines
American expatriate basketball people in Taiwan
American expatriate basketball people in Venezuela
American men's basketball players
Basketball players from Milwaukee
Centers (basketball)
Cocodrilos de Caracas players
Iowa Wolves players
Los Angeles Clippers players
Maryland Terrapins men's basketball players
New Orleans Pelicans draft picks
Parade High School All-Americans (boys' basketball)
Philippine Basketball Association imports
Rio Grande Valley Vipers players
Salt Lake City Stars players
San Miguel Beermen players
Santa Cruz Warriors players
TaiwanBeer HeroBears players
T1 League imports
Windy City Bulls players
Taichung Suns players